Gelgelab or Golgolab may refer to:
 Gelgelab, Ardabil
 Golgolab, East Azerbaijan